The 2015 Men's EuroHockey Championship II was the 6th edition of the Men's EuroHockey Championship II, the second level of the men's European field hockey championships organized by the European Hockey Federation. It was held from the 19th until the 27th of July 2015 in Prague, Czech Republic. 

The tournament also served as a qualifier for the 2017 EuroHockey Championship, with the finalists Poland and Austria qualifying.

Qualified teams

Format
The eight teams were split into two groups of four teams. The top two teams advanced to the semifinals to determine the winner in a knockout system. The bottom two teams played in a new group with the teams they did not play against in the group stage.

Results
All times were local (UTC+2).

Preliminary round

Pool A

Pool B

Fifth to eighth place classification

Pool C
The points obtained in the preliminary round against the other team are taken over.

First to fourth place classification

Semi-finals

Third and fourth place

Final

Final standings

 Qualified for the 2017 EuroHockey Championship

 Relegated to the EuroHockey Championship III

See also
2015 Men's EuroHockey Championship III
2015 Men's EuroHockey Nations Championship
2015 Women's EuroHockey Championship II

References

EuroHockey Championship II
Men 2
EuroHockey Championship II Men
International field hockey competitions hosted by the Czech Republic
EuroHockey Championship II Men
Sports competitions in Prague
2010s in Prague